East High School is a public high school located on the near east side of Columbus, Ohio at 1500 E. Broad Street. It is a part of Columbus City Schools. It was originally constructed in 1922.

Renovation work at East High School was completed in December 2008. The work included restoring numerous skylights throughout the building, refinishing the solid woodwork and wrought iron railings, as well as installing energy-efficient lighting fixtures. The new capacity is 1032 students. Included in the renovation was the addition of a  gymnasium, which features three full-sized basketball courts and seating for 1850 spectators. The total construction cost was $28.2 million.

Notable alumni
Kevin Boyce, Ohio State Treasurer
Bernie Casey, NFL player, actor
Hearcel Craig, Columbus City Councilman, Ohio Legislator and Ohio State Senate.
Chic Harley, College Football Hall of Fame 1951. Ohio State University Stadium is "The House That Harley Built"
Bo Lamar, former NBA player
Jim Marshall, former NFL player
Ray Miller, elected to the Ohio House of Representatives and the Ohio Senate.
Alex Moore, American football player
Ed Ratleff, college basketball All-American and NBA player
Gardner Rea, cartoonist
Thelma Thall, two-time world table tennis champion.
James Thurber, writer, humorist, cartoonist (attended the original East HS on Franklin Ave.)
D. K. Wilgus (graduated 1935), folksong scholar and academic
Granville Waiters, NBA player
Chuckie Williams, college basketball All-American and NBA player
Bill Willis, College Football Hall of Fame 1977. Ohio State lineman 1941-44

Athletics

Columbus East won the first state boys basketball championship for the capital city in 1951. This was Columbus, Ohio's first basketball championship for the high school category. This team is considered to be one of the greatest teams in Ohio high school basketball history. The team was composed of Rollie Harris, Romey Watkins, Dick Linson, Ed Granger, and Bill Truss. They were coached by the legendary Paul "Bucky" Walters. This historic team beat the highly favored Hamilton Big Blue in the State finals before a soldout crowd. The Walters team used an advanced defense called the "flat iron" zone. The offense was also ahead of their time relying on the incredible passing skills of Watkins and the "fast break".

Ohio High School Athletic Association state championships

 Boys Baseball - 1969
 Boys Basketball – 1951,1963,1968,1969,1979
 Boys Cross Country – 1955
 Boys Track and Field – 1914
 Girls Track and Field – 1982,1983

See also
 Schools in Columbus, Ohio

References

External links

 District Website

1898 establishments in Ohio
Educational institutions established in 1898
High schools in Columbus, Ohio
Public high schools in Ohio
Woodland Park (Columbus, Ohio)